Wisconsin recall effort may refer to:
 Recall elections in Wisconsin
 2011 Wisconsin Senate recall elections
 2012 Wisconsin Senate recall elections
 2012 Wisconsin gubernatorial recall election